Liuzhou Wuling Automobile Industry Co., Ltd. (doing business as Wuling Motors) is a Chinese manufacturer of automobiles, officially established as a joint venture by Liuzhou Wuling Motors Co., Ltd. (shortened "Wuling Group") and Wuling Automobile Group Holdings Ltd.

They produce engines, and special purpose vehicles, namely mini electric cars, people movers, trucks and buses, and auto parts.

The company also operates a joint venture with SAIC and General Motors, called SAIC-GM-Wuling (SGMW).

History
Wuling microvans have been manufactured since 1982. In 1986, Wuling's predecessor company, Liuzhou Automotive Industry Corporation, reached an agreement with Mitsubishi Motors to assemble the L100 type Mitsubishi Minicab. This small van was sold as the Liuzhou Wuling LZ110.

The first Wulings to be exported were sent to Thailand in 1992.

In 2001, "SAIC Wuling Automobile Co. Ltd." was established, and SAIC-GM-Wuling was established in 2002, a joint venture with SAIC Motor and General Motors.

Products 

 Weiwei
 V2
 M100
 S100
 Q490

Gallery

Subsidiaries and joint ventures

 Liuzhou Wuling Motors United Development Co. Ltd.
 Liuzhou Wuling Special-purpose Vehicle Manufacturing Co. Ltd. 
 Liuzhou Wuling Liuji Power Co. Ltd.
 Wuling Engine, a division of Wuling Automobile which manufactures Wuling-branded engines for small autos and motorcycles. Some are in cooperation with companies such as Delphi.
 Liuzhou AAM, a joint venture between Wuling and American Axle & Manufacturing, manufacturing electric drive units, independent rear axles and driveheads.

Wuling Automobile also manufactures generator sets under the "Longward" brand.

References

External links

 

 
Car manufacturers of China
SAIC-GM-Wuling
Bus manufacturers of China
Electric vehicle manufacturers of China
Truck manufacturers of China
General Motors marques
SAIC Motor brands
Companies based in Liuzhou
Chinese brands
Chinese companies established in 1998
Vehicle manufacturing companies established in 1998